Mother Leafy  Anderson (1887–1927) was born in Wisconsin in the 19th century. She was a Spiritualist, and her mediumship included contact with the spirit of the Native American war chief Black Hawk, who had lived in Illinois and Wisconsin, Anderson's home state.

Anderson was the founder of the Spiritual Church Movement in New Orleans, Louisiana in the 1920s, a loose confederation of churches largely based in the African American community. The church she founded in New Orleans featured traditional "Spirit Guides" in worship services, with a mixture of Protestant and Catholic Christian iconography, as well as special services and hymns that honored the spirit of the Sauk leader Black Hawk. 

After Anderson's death, her successor, Mother Catherine Seals, then led the church, The Temple of the Innocent Blood, until her death, at which point it fractured, giving rise to a multiplicity of Spiritualist denominations in New Orleans and elsewhere. 

These denominations, along with a number of similar but independent Spiritualist churches across America, are known today as the "Spiritual Church Movement."

See also
Spiritualism
Spiritualist Church
List of Spiritualist organizations

References

Afro-American religion
American religious leaders
People from New Orleans
People from Wisconsin
1887 births
1927 deaths